Saint-Chély-du-Tarn is a village in the commune of Sainte-Enimie, of the Lozère département in France. It is located in the Gorges du Tarn. Saint-Chély-du-Tarn can be accessed via an arched bridge across the Tarn river.

References

Geography of Lozère

fr:Sainte-Enimie#Saint-Chély-du-Tarn